The Xavier Musketeers are the 16 teams representing Xavier University in intercollegiate athletics, including men's and women's basketball, cross country, golf, soccer, swimming, tennis, indoor track and field, and outdoor track and field. The Musketeers compete in the NCAA Division I and are members of the Big East Conference. Their official colors are Xavier blue, silver metallic, silver gray and white.

On March 20, 2013, the Xavier administration announced that the university would leave the Atlantic 10 Conference to join the Big East, and it moved to the new conference on July 1, 2013.

Teams 

Xavier previously fielded an American football team, but it was discontinued in 1973.

Xavier's next sport to be added will be women's lacrosse, which starts play as an independent in the 2023 season (2022–23 school year) before starting Big East play in 2024.

National championships

Individual

References

External links